The Prizrak Brigade (meaning "Ghost Brigade"), founded by Aleksey Mozgovoy, is an infantry unit of the Luhansk People's Republic (LPR), one of the self-proclaimed breakaway states located in the Donbas. It is officially designated "Prizrak Mechanized Brigade" and "4th Territorial Defense Brigade (Alchevsk)". According to Amnesty International, the unit is one of the separatist units known for brutal treatment and torture of prisoners of war.

History 
The unit was established in late 2014 after anti-Maidan protesters occupied the RSA buildings in Luhansk. It began as a platoon sized unit, but in August 2014 it became a battalion as the number of fighters grew to 1,000. The commander of the Brigade Aleksey Mozgovoy claimed in late December 2014 to have up to 3,000 fighters. The brigade quickly earned a "feared" reputation and was regarded as one of the best units loyal to the LPR. However, the Prizrak Brigade deliberately stayed outside the developing umbrella structures among the separatists, initially neither joining the Army of the South-East or the LPR People's Militia. In early 2015, it fought in the Battle of Debaltseve.

Mozgovoy was killed in an IED and gun ambush on 23 May 2015 along with a number of his bodyguards. Separatist authorities blamed Ukrainian assassins, but investigators and members of his unit suspected that his local rivals were responsible. Researcher Mark Galeotti argued that the assassination was "mysterious" and noted that the Prizrak Brigade ceased its great autonomy following Mozgovoy's death. The unit was subsequently reorganized as the "4th Territorial Defense Brigade (Alchevsk)" of the United Armed Forces of Novorossiya. In the same year, all "military units" of the DPR and LPR were designated as "terrorist organisations" by Supreme Court of Ukraine. Security Service of Ukraine has been pursuing units members in order to detain them since then.

On 24 October 2020 Aleksey Markov, political and military leader of the group after the assassination of Aleksey Mozgovoy, died in a car accident.

In the 2022 Russian invasion of Ukraine, the Prizrak Brigade took part in the Eastern Ukraine offensive.

Organization 

The Prizrak Brigade considers itself both a military combat unit as well as an anti-Imperialist and revolutionary socialist political organization.

Membership of Prizrak comprises primarily of east Ukrainians and Russian nationals, however, due to their political ethos the unit does draw in a number of foreign volunteers. These foreigners come from France, Italy, Brazil, Spain, Norway, Colombia. In the brigade's early phase, several foreign volunteers were associated with "Unité Continentale", a group which described itself as socialist and enlisted both French as well as Brazilians, but had reportedly been founded by French ultranationalists.

In 2015, a far-left military political unit composed of internationalist volunteers called "Interunit" was built inside the Prizrak Brigade, and was operational until 2017. The emblem of the unit was that of the International Brigades of the Spanish Civil War. The bulk of the unit's volunteers came from Spain and it was commanded by an Italian fighter called "Nemo". By 2019, the foreigners mainly operated as part of the Prizrak Brigade's Unit 404 and the Biryukov-Markov Unit. The latter, alternatively called the "Volunteer Communist Detachment", is mostly composed of Communists and commanded by Pyotr Biryukov.

The Prizrak Brigade also includes many individuals claiming Cossack heritage, resulting in it being nicknamed the "Antrastsit Cossacks".

War crimes 
A former Ukrainian POW of the Prizrak Brigade told Amnesty International that his captors had brutally tortured him and other prisoners, including through daily beatings, near-starvation, and the stabbing as well as shooting of body parts. The group also forced prisoners to read confessions on Russian TV.

See also 
 Russian separatist forces in Donbas
 Somalia Battalion
 Sparta Battalion
 2014 pro-Russian unrest in Ukraine
 Regionalism in Ukraine

References

Works cited
 

Military units and formations established in 2014
Pro-Russian militant groups
Separatist forces of the war in Donbas
2014 establishments in Ukraine
Paramilitary organizations based in Ukraine
Military of the Luhansk People's Republic